Cash flow refers to the movement of cash into or out of a business, a project, or a financial product. 

Cashflow or Cash Flow may also refer to:

Songs
 "Cash Flow" (song), a 2008 song by Ace Hood
 "Cashflow" (D'banj song), a 2012 song by D'banj and Kay Switch
"Cashflow", a 1982 song by Leisure Process

Other
 Cash Flow (comics), the Uncle Scrooge comic book by Don Rosa
 Cashflow 101, a board game
 Cash Flow (TV program), the CNBC Asia show
 Ca$hflow, an 80's R&B group that recorded for Atlanta Artists